The 2002 Individual Long Track/Grasstrack World Championship was the 32nd edition of the FIM speedway Individual Long Track World Championship.

The world title was won by Robert Barth of Germany.

Venues

Final Classification

References 

2002
Speedway competitions in France
Speedway competitions in Germany
Long